Georgia's Got Talent ( (Nichieri) - Talented) is the Georgian version of the Got Talent series. It launched on Rustavi 2 on February 1, 2010. Singers, dancers, comedians, variety acts, and other performers compete against each other for audience support. The winner of the show receives 500,000 laris ($279,500/€217,000/£185,500). It is hosted by Tika Patsatsia and Vano Tarkhnishvili. The judges are Nika Memanishvili, Maia Asatiani and Gega Palavandishvili.

Season 1 (2010)
The first season of Georgia's Got Talent!, which started on February 1, 2010, and ended on May 3, was won by Levan Shavadze, singer.

Season 2 (2011)
The second season aired in 2011. The winner was Vano Pipia, who is diagnosed with, and suffering from polio.

Season 3 (2012)
The third season aired in 2012

References

External links
Official website 

2010 Georgia (country) television series debuts
Television series by Fremantle (company)
Non-British television series based on British television series
Rustavi 2 original programming